Uppsala Old Cemetery is a cemetery in Uppsala, Sweden.

Notable burials 
 Greta Arwidsson (1906–1998)
 Lasse Eriksson (1949–2011)
 Gustaf Fröding (1860–1911)
 Dag Hammarskjöld (1905–1961)
 Salomon Eberhard Henschen (1847–1930)
 Gösta Knutsson (1908–1973)
 Lotten von Kræmer (1828–1912)
 Bruno Liljefors (1860–1939)
 Viveca Lindfors (1920–1995)
 Davud Monshizadeh (1914–1989)
 Joachim Daniel Andreas Müller (1812–1857
 Sven Odén (1887–1934)
 Håkan Parkman (1955–1988)
 Anders Fredrik Regnell (1807–1884)
 Jan-Erik Roos (1935–2017)
 Margit Sahlin (1914–2003)
 Carl Einar Thure af Wirsén (1875–1946)

External links
 

Cemeteries in Sweden
Burials at Uppsala old cemetery